Namatanai Open Seat is an Electorate in the New Ireland Province of Papua New Guinea. The Member of Parliament representing this seat is Walter Schnaubelt. Former Prime Minister of Papua New Guinea Sir Julius Chan represented this electorate from 1968 to 1997. Ephraim Apelis became the second Member for Namatanai from 1997 to 2002. Byron Chan became Member for Namatanai in 2002-2017 until his subsequent defeat to his cousin Walter Schnaubelt in the 2017 National Elections.

Papua New Guinea